Dobson v North Cumbria NHS Foundation Trust [2021] IRLR 729 (EAT) is a UK labour law case, concerning the child care disparity that women face.

Facts 
Dobson claimed that NHS Trust's demand for "flexible" work at weekends amounted to indirect sex discrimination, because it disadvantaged her in her care for 3 children, two of whom were disabled.

The Tribunal decided there was no particular disadvantage because other women could do it, and so could the only man in the team.

Judgment
Choudhury J, reversing the Tribunal, found that the Tribunal was wrong in comparing only people in the team, as the proper comparison would be all people who were required to work flexibly. It was uncontroversial that there was a disparity in child care burdens for women. Tribunals could and should take judicial notice of this matter, even if it is not pleaded.

See also
UK labour law

Notes

References

United Kingdom labour case law